Yuri Markovich Schmidt (10 May 1937 – 12 January 2013) was a Russian human rights lawyer known for defending dissidents since the 1970s.

Schmidt was born in Leningrad. He was a member of the Mikhail Khodorkovsky defense team from 2004, and headed the legal team for several years. He died in 2013 in St. Petersburg following a long battle with cancer. He was 75 years old.

Early life
Yuri Schmidt was born in Leningrad on May 10, 1937, while the USSR was going through the period of the Stalinist great purge. His father, declared as the "enemy of the people", was imprisoned in the gulag for 19 years shortly after Schmidt was born. Schmidt began studying law and graduated from Saint Petersburg State University in 1960.

Career 
He was not one of the lawyers considered "reliable" by the regime and pleaded in criminal proceedings for 30 years. In 1986, Schmidt was struck off the bar association. After pleading his case, he was reinstated a year later.

References

External links
 Remembering Yuri Schmidt
 Yuri Schmidt, Lawyer for Mikhail Khodorkovsky, Dies at Age 75

1937 births
2013 deaths
Lawyers from Saint Petersburg
Russian human rights activists
Human rights lawyers